Jonathan Jacob Hirtle is an investment industry executive who pioneered the outsourced Chief Investment Officer (OCIO) model. For his OCIO innovations, Hirtle has been dubbed the “Oracle of Outsource.”

In 1988, Hirtle co-founded Hirtle, Callaghan & Co., recognized as the first OCIO firm to serve family groups and organizations that does not employ fully staffed investment departments.  The firm has over $20 billion under management.

Hirtle serves as Executive Chairman of Hirtle, Callaghan & Co., LLC. He is also a Member of the Investment Policy Committee at the company.

Background 
Jonathan Hirtle was born in Cheswick, Pennsylvania in 1952 and graduated from Springdale High School in Springdale, PA.

Hirtle earned a BA in 1974 and an MBA in 1982 from Pennsylvania State University. From 1975 to 1982, Hirtle served as an officer in the United States Marine Corps.

Prior to founding Hirtle Callaghan in 1988, Hirtle served as vice president at Goldman, Sachs & Co. for six years, advising family groups and institutions on investment strategy and securities selection.

Hirtle co-founded Hirtle Callaghan with Donald E. Callaghan, another Goldman Sachs vice president, to serve solely as an outsourced Chief Investment Officer and investment department to family groups and institutions that chose not to develop and pay for a full-staffed internal investment department.

Hirtle, Callaghan & Co. 
Hirtle, Callaghan & Co. designs and supervises comprehensive investment programs for families and institutions, and customizes its investment approach for each individual client.

The firm manages over $20 billion under prescribed direction split equally between family and institutional clients.

Hirtle serves as the firm’s Executive Chairman and leads the firm’s Management Committee, which directs and implements firmwide strategy and ensures effective management across all areas of the business.

Outsourced Chief Investment Officer Model 
At Hirtle Callaghan, Jonathan Hirtle pioneered the now-popular outsourced Chief Investment Officer (OCIO) model.

Media source 
As a pioneer of the OCIO investment model, Jonathan Hirtle has become a go-to OCIO industry expert for the media and has been featured in investment magazines, national broadcast outlets, and many publications. Hirtle is sought out for commentary on emerging trends and regularly offers investment advice to others in the industry.

References

1952 births
Living people
People from Cheswick, Pennsylvania
Goldman Sachs people
American chief executives of financial services companies
American money managers
Smeal College of Business alumni
Chief investment officers